The Last Tempest (translit. Ying tai qi xue) is a 1976 Hong Kong drama film directed by Li Han-hsiang. The film was selected as the Hong Kong entry for the Best Foreign Language Film at the 49th Academy Awards, but was not accepted as a nominee.

Cast
 Ti Lung as Emperor Guangxu
 Lisa Lu as Empress Dowager Cixi
 Ivy Ling Po as Empress Xiaodingjing
 Siu Yiu as Consort Zhen
 Miao Tien as Li Lianying
 Wong Yue as Zhang Jinxi
 Lin Yun as Kang Youwei
Yueh Hua as Tan Sitong
Chen Ping as Consort Jin
Shum Lo as Eunuch Wang Shang
Ingrid Hu Yan Yan as Princess Der Ling
Wong Sun  as Yuan Shikai
Yeung Chi-hing as Official Hsu Tung
Wang Hsieh as Official Kang Li
Chiang Nan as Official Tai Yi
Ching Miao as Ronglu
Lo Hol Pang as Yang Shenxiu
Kong Ngai as Lin Xu

See also
 List of submissions to the 49th Academy Awards for Best Foreign Language Film
 List of Hong Kong submissions for the Academy Award for Best Foreign Language Film

References

External links

1976 films
1976 drama films
1970s Mandarin-language films
Films directed by Li Han-hsiang
Films set in 19th-century Qing dynasty
Cultural depictions of Empress Dowager Cixi
Hong Kong drama films
1970s Hong Kong films